Watchman or Watchmen may refer to:

Arts, entertainment, and media
Watchman (film), a 2019 Tamil thriller film
Watchman (novel), a 1988 thriller novel by Ian Rankin
Watchmen, a 1986 comic book limited series by Alan Moore and Dave Gibbons
Watchmen (film), the 2009 film adaptation of the comic book
Watchmen (TV series), a TV series adaptation of the comic book and feature film
Watchmen: Motion Comic, a TV miniseries adaptation that aired in 2008
Watchmen: The End Is Nigh, a video game prequel to the film
The Watchman (Grubb novel), a 1961 novel by Davis Grubb
Go Set a Watchman, the second novel by author Harper Lee
The Watchmen (band), a Canadian rock band

Other uses
Watchman (law enforcement), a member of a group who provided law enforcement
Watchman, a sailor responsible for watchkeeping aboard ship 
Security guard or watchman, a person who watches over and protects property, assets, or people
Watchman (mascot), a Staffordshire Bull Terrier, mascot of the Staffordshire and Mercian Regiments
, a destroyer of the British Royal Navy launched in 1917 and sold in 1945 for scrapping
Sony Watchman, a line of portable television devices produced by Sony
Watchman camera, a system of cameras for controlling traffic and deterring speeding in the United Kingdom
Watchman device, a type of left atrial appendage occlusion system to prevent blood clot formation in certain heart rhythm disturbances
Watchman Island, a small sandstone island in the Waitemata Harbour of Auckland, New Zealand

See also
Nightwatchman (disambiguation)
Sentinel (disambiguation)
Sentry (disambiguation)
The Watchman (disambiguation)
Vigilante